The 1981 Society of West End Theatre Awards were held in 1981 in London celebrating excellence in West End theatre by the Society of West End Theatre. The awards would not become the Laurence Olivier Awards, as they are known today, until the 1984 ceremony.

Winners and nominees
Details of winners (in bold) and nominees, in each award category, per the Society of London Theatre.

{| class=wikitable style="width="100%"
|-
! width="50%" | Play of the Year
! width="50%" | Musical of the Year
|-
| valign="top" |
 Children of a Lesser God by Mark Medoff – Albery Passion Play by Peter Nichols – RSC at the Aldwych
 Translations by Brian Friel – National Theatre Lyttelton
 Quartermaine's Terms by Simon Gray – Queen's
| valign="top" |
 Cats – New London Barnum – London Palladium
 One Mo' Time – Cambridge
 The Best Little Whorehouse in Texas – Theatre Royal Drury Lane
|-
! colspan=1| Comedy of the Year
|-
|
 Steaming by Nell Dunn – Comedy Anyone for Denis by John Wells – Whitehall
 Can't Pay? Won't Pay! by Dario Fo – Criterion
 On the Razzle by Tom Stoppard – National Theatre Lyttelton
|-
! style="width="50%" | Actor of the Year in a New Play
! style="width="50%" | Actress of the Year in a New Play
|-
| valign="top" |
 Trevor Eve as James Leeds in Children of a Lesser God – Albery Edward Fox as St. John Quartermaine in Quartermaine's Terms – Queen's
 James Grout as Henry Windscape in Quartermaine's Terms – Queen's
 Karl Johnson in Television Times – RSC at the Warehouse
| valign="top" |
 Elizabeth Quinn as Sarah Norman in Children of a Lesser God – Albery Eileen Atkins as Nell in Passion Play – RSC at the Aldwych
 Janet Dale as May in The Accrington Pals – RSC at the Warehouse
 Maggie Smith as Virginia Woolf in Virginia – Theatre Royal Haymarket
|-
! style="width="50%" | Actor of the Year in a Revival
! style="width="50%" | Actress of the Year in a Revival
|-
| valign="top" |
 Daniel Massey as Jack Tanner in Man and Superman – National Theatre Olivier Warren Mitchell as Davies in The Caretaker – National Theatre Lyttelton
 David Suchet as Shylock in The Merchant of Venice – RSC at the Aldwych
 John Wood as Sir John Brute in The Provoked Wife – National Theatre Lyttelton
| valign="top" |
 Margaret Tyzack as Martha in Who's Afraid of Virginia Woolf – National Theatre Lyttelton Sinéad Cusack as Evadne in The Maid's Tragedy – RSC at the Warehouse
 Rosemary Harris as Kate Keller in All My Sons – Wyndham's
 Penelope Wilton as Ann Whitefield in Man and Superman – National Theatre Olivier
|-
! style="width="50%" | Actor of the Year in a Musical
! style="width="50%" | Actress of the Year in a Musical
|-
| valign="top" |
 Michael Crawford as P. T. Barnum in Barnum – London Palladium
 Brian Blessed as Old Deuteronomy in Cats – New London
 Henderson Forsythe as Sheriff Ed Earl Dodd in The Best Little Whorehouse in Texas – Theatre Royal Drury Lane
 Wayne Sleep as Mr. Mistoffolees in Cats – New London
| valign="top" |
 Carlin Glynn as Mona Stangley in The Best Little Whorehouse in Texas – Theatre Royal Drury Lane
 Petula Clark as Maria von Trapp in The Sound of Music – Apollo Victoria
 Patricia Hodge as Nancy Mitford in The Mitford Girls – Globe
 Sylvia Kumba Williams as Big Bertha Williams in One Mo' Time – Cambridge
|-
! colspan=1| Comedy Performance of the Year
|-
|
 Rowan Atkinson as Himself in Rowan Atkinson in Revue – Globe
 Georgina Hale as Josie in Steaming – Comedy
 Donald Sinden as Garry Essendine in Present Laughter – Vaudeville
 Angela Thorne as Margaret Thatcher in Anyone for Denis – Whitehall
|-
! style="width="50%" | Actor of the Year in a Supporting Role
! style="width="50%" | Actress of the Year in a Supporting Role
|-
| valign="top" |
 Joe Melia as Maurice in Good – RSC at the Warehouse
 Tony Church as Polonius in Hamlet – RSC at the Aldwych 
 Norman Rodway as Seuman Shields in The Shadow of a Gunman – RSC at the Warehouse
 Tom Wilkinson as Horatio in Hamlet – RSC at the Aldwych
| valign="top" |
 Gwen Watford as Monica Reed in Present Laughter – Vaudeville
 Brenda Bruce as Nurse in Romeo and Juliet – RSC at the Aldwych
 Sinéad Cusack as Celia in As You Like It – RSC at the Aldwych
 Gwen Taylor as Queen Gertrude in Hamlet – Ambassadors
|-
! colspan=1| Most Promising Newcomer of the Year in Theatre
|-
|
 Alice Krige as Raina Petkoff in Arms and the Man – Lyric
 Catherine Hall as Gemma in Naked Robots – RSC at the Warehouse
 Jeremy Nicholas for writing and performing as Various in Three Men in a Boat – Mayfair
 Eric Peterson as Billy Bishop in Billy Bishop Goes to War – Comedy
|-
! colspan=1| Director of the Year
|-
|
 Peter Wood for On the Razzle – National Theatre Lyttelton
 Donald McWhinnie for Translations – National Theatre Lyttelton
 Trevor Nunn for Cats – New London
 Harold Pinter for Quartermaine's Terms – Queen's
|-
! colspan=1| Designer of the Year
|-
|
 Carl Toms for The Provoked Wife – National Theatre Lyttelton
 Eileen Diss for Measure for Measure – National Theatre Lyttelton
 John Napier for Cats – New London
 Saul Radomsky for Tonight at 8.30 – Lyric
|-
! colspan=1| Outstanding Achievement of the Year in a Musical
|-
|
 Gillian Lynne for choreographing Cats – New London
 Vernel Bagneris for directing and writing One Mo' Time – Cambridge
 The staging of Barnum – London Palladium
 The style and design of The Mitford Girls – Globe
|-
! style="width="50%" | Outstanding Achievement of the Year in Ballet
! style="width="50%" | Outstanding First Achievement of the Year in Ballet
|-
| valign="top" |
 Forgotten Land, Stuttgart Ballet – London Coliseum Dances of Albion, The Royal Ballet – Royal Opera House
 Death and the Maiden, London Contemporary Dance Theatre – Sadler's Wells
 Night Moves, The Royal Ballet – Sadler's Wells
| valign="top" |
 Bryony Brind in Dances of Albion, The Royal Ballet – Royal Opera House Stephen Beagley for work in new productions, The Royal Ballet – Royal Opera House
 Michael Clark for work in new productions, Ballet Rambert – Sadler's Wells 
 Ashley Page in Isadora, The Royal Ballet – Royal Opera House
|-
! style="width="50%" | Outstanding Achievement in Opera
! style="width="50%" | Outstanding First Achievement of the Year in Opera
|-
| valign="top" |
 Les contes d'Hoffmann, The Royal Opera – Royal Opera House Die Frau ohne Schatten, Welsh National Opera – Dominion
 Lulu, The Royal Opera – Royal Opera House
 Samson et Delilah, The Royal Opera – Royal Opera House
| valign="top" |
 Ann Mackay in The Gypsy Princess – Sadler's Wells' Helen Field in The Cunning Little Vixen – Dominion
 Claire Powell in Les contes d'Hoffmann, The Royal Opera – Royal Opera House
 David Wilson-Johnson in The Lighthouse – Sadler's Wells
|}

Productions with multiple nominations and awards
The following 18 productions, including one ballet and one opera, received multiple nominations:

 6: Cats 3: Barnum, Children of a Lesser God, Hamlet, One Mo' Time and The Best Little Whorehouse in Texas 2: Anyone for Denis, Dances of Albion, Les contes d'Hoffmann, Man and Superman, On the Razzle, Passion Play, Present Laughter, Quartermaine's Terms, Steaming, The Mitford Girls, The Provoked Wife and TranslationsThe following two productions received multiple awards:

 3: Children of a Lesser God 2: Cats''

See also
 35th Tony Awards

References

External links
 Previous Olivier Winners – 1981

Laurence Olivier Awards ceremonies
Laurence Olivier Awards, 1981
Laurence Olivier Awards
1981 theatre awards